The yellow-vented flowerpecker (Dicaeum chrysorrheum) is a species of bird in the family Dicaeidae. It is found in Bangladesh, Bhutan, Brunei, Cambodia, China, India, Indonesia, Laos, Malaysia, Myanmar, Nepal, Singapore, Thailand, and Vietnam. Its natural habitats are subtropical or tropical moist lowland forest and subtropical or tropical moist montane forest. Along with D. melanoxanthum, D. agile, and D. everetti, it is often referred to as an “odd” Dicaeum species because of unique characteristics separating it from other species within the family. While most species have vestigial outermost primary feathers, those of the yellow-vented flowerpecker are elongated.

References

External links
Image at ADW

yellow-vented flowerpecker
Birds of Eastern Himalaya
Birds of Yunnan
Birds of Southeast Asia
yellow-vented flowerpecker
Taxonomy articles created by Polbot